Runyantown is an unincorporated community in Clark County, Indiana, in the United States.

History
A post office was established as Runyan in 1897, and it remained in operation until it was discontinued in 1902. G. Hesse Runyan served as the postmaster.

References

Unincorporated communities in Clark County, Indiana
Unincorporated communities in Indiana